Standesamt Schneidemühl was a civil registration district (Standesamt) in Kreis Kolmar, province of Posen of the German Empire (1871–1918). The administration offices were in the town of Schneidemühl, with both urban and rural sub-offices, and administered the communities of:

Bro = Brodden; Fri = Friedheim, Kr Wirsitz; Kro = Krojanke, Kr Flatow, West Prussia; Mar = Margonin; Schm = Schmilau; Sch = Schneidemühl ; Sch (S) = Schneidemühl (town); Sch (L) = Schneidemühl (rural area); Usc = Usch 
OF = head forester
Population data may be inaccurate (see German census of 1895).

External links 
Piła (official site) http://www.pila.pl

This article is part of the project Wikipedia:WikiProject Prussian Standesamter. Please refer to the project page, before making changes.

Civil registration offices in the Province of Posen